Susan McCue was appointed to the Broadcasting Board of Governors on July 2, 2010, to a term expiring on August 13, 2011, and continued serving until May 22, 2014. By law, any member whose term has expired may serve until a successor has been appointed and qualified. McCue was co-chair of the Communications and Outreach Committee, of the BBG, chair of its subcommittee on innovation and was a member of the Governance Committee. After leaving the BBG, she joined the Board of Directors of the Millennium Challenge Corporation, an independent federal agency.

Career
Susan McCue is President of Message Global, a strategic advocacy firm she founded in 2008 for social action campaigns.  She was the founding President and CEO of The ONE Campaign to combat extreme global poverty and was chief of Staff to Senate Majority Leader Harry Reid from 1999 to 2007. Before that she held numerous communications positions in government and campaigns. She is currently Vice Chair of Humanity United and a member of the Council on Foreign Relations.

A New Jersey native, McCue is a graduate of Rutgers University in New Brunswick, New Jersey, with degrees in economics and journalism.

References

External links
 https://archive.today/20130630221836/http://www.bbg.gov/about-the-agency/board/susan-mccue/

Living people
People from New Jersey
Rutgers University alumni
New Jersey Democrats
Political chiefs of staff
United States congressional aides
Year of birth missing (living people)